Coyote is an American crime drama television series created by David Graziano, Michael Carnes and Josh Gilbert.  The series stars Michael Chiklis and premiered on CBS All Access on January 7, 2021.

The series was originally ordered as ten episodes, targeted for sibling Paramount Network, but eventually was passed off to CBS All Access as a six-episode season. In January 2023, the series was removed from Paramount+.

Premise
After 32 years of working as a Border Patrol agent, Ben Clemens is forced to work for the people he spent his career trying to keep out of the United States.

Cast
 Michael Chiklis as Ben Clemens, a recently retired U.S. Border Patrol agent
 Juan Pablo Raba as Juan Diego "El Catrin" Zamora, the head of a small family cartel
 Adriana Paz as Silvia Peña, manager of a local restaurant
 Kristyan Ferrer as Dante, a member of the cartel
 Octavio Pisano as Sultan, a member of the cartel
 Cynthia McWilliams as federal agent for Homeland Security Investigations
 Julio Cesar Cedillo as Neto Mendez, an officer in the Guardia Nacional de México
 Emy Mena as María Elena Flores, who is carrying Dante's child
 Kelli Williams as Jill Kerr

Episodes

Production

Development
Development of the series was first announced on May 1, 2019.  On June 26, 2019, it was reported that Paramount Network had given a 10-episode straight-to-series order to Coyote. On November 19, 2020, it was announced that the series will debut on CBS All Access rather than Paramount Network.

Filming
Filming occurred in Baja California in January 2020.

Critical response
Review aggregator Metacritic gave the series a score of 65 out of 100, indicating "generally favorable reviews", based on 8 professional critics.

References

External links
 
 

2020s American crime drama television series
2021 American television series debuts
2021 American television series endings
English-language television shows
Paramount+ original programming
Television series by Sony Pictures Television
Television shows filmed in Mexico
United States Border Patrol
Works about Mexican drug cartels